The girls' ski cross event in freestyle skiing at the 2020 Winter Youth  Olympics took place on 19 January at the Villars Winter Park.

Results

Group heats
Panel 1

Panel 2

Semifinals
Semifinal 1

Semifinal 2

Finals
Small final

Big final

References

 
Girls' ski cross